Duncan Kennedy (born December 20, 1967) is an American luger who competed from 1979 to 1997. He is best known for being the first American to win a Luge World Cup event when he won at the Sigulda track in November 1991 in the Latvia. Kennedy's best overall finish in the Luge World Cup was second twice, earning them in 1991–92 and 1993–94.

Competing in three Winter Olympics, Kennedy earned his best finish of tenth in the men's singles event at Albertville in 1992.

After retiring from competitive luge due to bleeding around the brain stem, Kennedy became a development coach for USA Luge, a position he still holds as of 2008. He was named a coach of the year for USA Luge in 2002.

During the 2002, 2006, 2010 and 2014 Winter Olympics Kennedy served as a television commentator for the luge competitions for NBC Sports in the United States.

References
1988 luge men's singles results
1992 luge men's singles results
1994 luge men's singles results
December 16, 1997 Washington Post article on Kennedy's retirement prior to the 1998 Winter Olympics in Nagano. - accessed April 1, 2008.
List of men's singles luge World Cup champions since 1978.
USA Luge.org contact information on all important people, including Kennedy. - accessed April 1, 2008.
US Olympic Committee article on Kennedy's 2002 coach of the year honors. - accessed April 1, 2008.
US Olympic Committee article 2004 article on the Top eleven moments during the first 25 years of USA Luge, including Kennedy's 1991 World Cup win. - accessed April 1, 2008.
Can Duncan do it? - accessed January 6, 2022.

1967 births
American male lugers
American television personalities
Male television personalities
Living people
Lugers at the 1988 Winter Olympics
Lugers at the 1992 Winter Olympics
Lugers at the 1994 Winter Olympics
Sportspeople from New York (state)
Olympic lugers of the United States